The Cataño Ferry is a single route ferry service between Cataño and San Juan, Puerto Rico. Its route consists of Cataño ⇆ Old San Juan docking at the AcuaExpreso Cataño Terminal in Cataño on the route's southwestern point at the AcuaExpreso San Juan Terminal in Pier 2 of the San Juan Port in Old San Juan on the route's northeastern point.

The ferry crosses the San Juan Bay with its services running from mornings to evenings seven days a week as the weather and maritime conditions permit. Although the service is heavily used by tourists, its primary purpose is to serve as a transportation hub for those who live nearby Cataño but work in San Juan in complementation with AcuaExpreso. Despite what the service's name implies, the service has been provided by multiple boats, not just one ship. The ferry is an icon in Puerto Rican culture.

History

The Cataño Ferry started operating in 1853, when the Cataño Steam Company used a small boat to transport cargo and passengers to San Juan. During its history, the ferry was managed by Férrea del Oeste and Compañía Popular de Transporte. According to passengers, the old boat was "a wooden boat; they called it the turtle because it was a small boat". In 1960, the Puerto Rico Ports Authority acquired the franchise, building a new terminal and buying five new ships.

The ferry covers only one route: from San Juan's dock to Cataño's ferry terminal. Since most people who used the service initiated the trip in San Juan, it became known as "La Lancha de Cataño", because it is believed that people use the service mostly to travel from San Juan to Cataño.

Despite notable decreases in its use, the service is widely known on the island, and popular with Puerto Ricans and tourists. Since the services are carried out from Old San Juan to Cataño and vice versa, its relative closeness to San Juan hotels made the service approachable to tourists. It is also popular with Puerto Rican and American soldiers who are based at nearby Fort Buchanan.

During the 1960s,service on La lancha cost only five cents one way. The ticket prices began to rise; however, by the 1980s, it cost 25 cents, and it currently costs 50 cents (one way).

Tickets are usually bought at the ferry terminals.

Also, during the 1980s, a famous salsa music singer filmed a well-known television commercial for a beer company at one of the ferries comprising the "Lancha de Cataño" boat fleet.

In 1988, the "Lancha de Cataño" service stopped being the only ship service that took people on San Juan-area trips only, when a small company introduced cruise services around Northern San Juan; these services typically lasted one hour and were carried on luxury ships, but their popularity eventually faded and the "Lancha de Cataño" regained its status as the only ship service taking place exclusively around the San Juan area.

On January 1, 2000, the Puerto Rican Government passed ownership of all legal passenger ship services to the Puerto Rican Maritime Transport Authority. While this was made mostly to enhance service between Culebra, Fajardo and Vieques, the deal also included the "Lancha de Cataño" service.

In 2004, slightly more than 1,100,000 passengers were transported by the "Lancha de Cataño" service. It is estimated that the numbers of passengers transported by the service will remain around that area for the next few years.

Features
Ferries used by "La Lancha"s services are two-story ships, which are painted in white, with a peach and orange drawing that resembles a wave to the front.

Occasionally, and under rough water conditions, passengers on the lower decks might be sprayed with water for a few seconds. No major accidents or incidents have been reported, however. Passengers who choose to ride on the boats' upper decks may stand up and hang by a fence, to look over at some touristic attractions and at ships located at the San Juan port.

Round-trip services leave both Catano and San Juan's terminals every fifteen (15) minutes, and, very often, passengers on one "Lancha de Cataño" ship find themselves waving at passengers on another "Lancha de Cataño". Sometimes, the "Lancha de Catano" may take passengers on a trip around the El Morro Castle before arriving at its actual destination.

Current prices stand at:
Adults - $0.50
Kids (3-11) - $0.25
Elderly and the Disabled - $0.25

See also
Culebra Ferry
Vieques Ferry

External links
Puerto Rican Government's page on Lancha de Cataño's economical impact, in Spanish

References

Puerto Rico Department of Transportation and Public Works
Ferries of Puerto Rico